The Sarasvati River is a deified river first mentioned in the Rigveda and later in Vedic and post-Vedic texts. It played an important role in the Vedic religion, appearing in all but the fourth book of the Rigveda.

As a physical river, in the oldest texts of the Rigveda it is described as a "great and holy river in north-western India," but in the middle and late Rigvedic books it is described as a small river ending in "a terminal lake (samudra)." As the goddess Sarasvati, the other referent for the term "Sarasvati" which developed into an independent identity in post-Vedic times, the river is also described as a powerful river and mighty flood. The Sarasvati is also considered by Hindus to exist in a metaphysical form, in which it formed a confluence with the sacred rivers Ganges and Yamuna, at the Triveni Sangam. According to Michael Witzel, superimposed on the Vedic Sarasvati river is the heavenly river Milky Way, which is seen as "a road to immortality and heavenly after-life."

Rigvedic and later Vedic texts have been used to propose identification with present-day rivers, or ancient riverbeds. The Nadistuti hymn in the Rigveda (10.75) mentions the Sarasvati between the Yamuna in the east and the Sutlej in the west, while RV 7.95.1-2, describes the Sarasvati as flowing to the samudra, a word now usually translated as 'ocean', but which could also mean "lake." Later Vedic texts such as the Tandya Brahmana and the Jaiminiya Brahmana, as well as the Mahabharata, mention that the Sarasvati dried up in a desert.

Since the late 19th-century, numerous scholars have proposed to identify the Sarasvati with the Ghaggar-Hakra River system, which flows through northwestern India and eastern Pakistan, between the Yamuna and the Sutlej, and ends in the Thar desert. Recent geophysical research shows that the supposed downstream Ghaggar-Hakra paleochannel is actually a paleochannel of the Sutlej,  which flowed into the Nara river, a delta channel of the Indus River. 10,000-8,000 years ago this channel was abandoned when the Sutlej diverted its course, leaving the Ghaggar-Hakra as a system of monsoon-fed rivers which did not reach the sea.

The Indus Valley Civilisation prospered when the monsoons that fed the rivers diminished around 5,000 years ago, and ISRO has observed that major Indus Valley civilization urban sites at Kalibangan (Rajasthan), Banawali and Rakhigarhi (Haryana), Dholavira and Lothal (Gujarat) lay along this course. When the monsoons that fed the rivers further diminished the Hakra dried-up some 4,000 years ago, becoming an intermittent river, and the urban Harappan civilisation declined, becoming localized in smaller agricultural communities.
 
Identification of a mighty physical Rigvedic Sarasvati with the Ghaggar-Hakra system is therefore problematic, since the Gagghar-Hakra had dried-up well before the time of the composition of the Rigveda. In the words of Wilke and Moebus, the Sarasvati had been reduced to a "small, sorry trickle in the desert", by the time that the Vedic people migrated into north-west India. Rigvedic references to a physical river also indicate that the Sarasvati "had already lost its main source of water supply and must have ended in a terminal lake (samudra)  approximately 3000 years ago," "depicting the present-day situation, with the Sarasvatī having lost most of its water." Rigvedic descriptions of the Sarasvati also do not fit the actual course of the Gagghar-Hakra.

"Sarasvati" has also been identified with the Helmand [in the Arachosia or Haraxvati region] in southern Afghanistan, the name of which may have been reused in its Sanskrit form as the name of the Ghaggar-Hakra river, after the Vedic tribes moved to the Punjab. Sarasvati of the Rigveda may also refer to two distinct rivers, with the family books referring to the Helmand River, and the more recent 10th mandala referring to the Ghaggar-Hakra.

The identification with the Ghaggar-Hakra system took on new significance in the early 21st century, with some suggesting an earlier dating of the Rigveda; renaming the Indus Valley Civilisation as the "Sarasvati culture", the "Sarasvati Civilization", the "Indus-Sarasvati Civilization" or the "Sindhu-Sarasvati Civilization," suggesting that the Indus Valley and Vedic cultures can be equated; and rejecting the Indo-Aryan migrations theory, which postulates an extended period of migrations of Indo-European speaking people into South Asia between ca. 1900 and 1400 BCE.

Etymology 
 is the feminine nominative singular form of the adjective  (which occurs in the Rigveda as the name of the keeper of the celestial waters), derived from ‘sáras’ + ‘vat’, meaning ‘having sáras-’.  Sanskrit  means ‘lake, pond’ (cf. the derivative  ‘lake bird = Sarus crane’). Mayrhofer considers unlikely a connection with the root * ‘run, flow’ but does agree that it could have been a river that connected many lakes due to its abundant volumes of water-flow.

 may be a cognate of Avestan Haraxvatī, perhaps. In the younger Avesta, Haraxvatī is Arachosia, a region described to be rich in rivers, and its Old Persian cognate Harauvati.

Importance in Hinduism 
The Saraswati river was revered and considered important for Hindus because it is said that it was on this river's banks, along with its tributary Drishadwati, in the Vedic state of Brahmavarta, that Vedic Sanskrit had its genesis, and important Vedic scriptures like initial part of Rigveda and several Upanishads were supposed to have been composed by Vedic seers. In the Manusmriti, Brahmavarta is portrayed as the "pure" centre of Vedic culture. Bridget and Raymond Allchin in The Rise of Civilization in India and Pakistan took the view that "The earliest Aryan homeland in India-Pakistan (Aryavarta or Brahmavarta) was in the Punjab and in the valleys of the Sarasvati and Drishadvati rivers in the time of the Rigveda."

Rigveda

As a river
The Sarasvati River is mentioned in all but the fourth book of the Vedas  Macdonell and Keith provided a comprehensive survey of Vedic references to the Sarasvati River in their Vedic Index. In the late book 10, only two references are unambiguously to the river: 10.64.9, calling for the aid of three  "great rivers", Sindhu, Sarasvati and Sarayu; and 10.75.5, the geographical list of the Nadistuti Sukta. In this hymn, the Sarasvati River is placed between the Yamuna and the Sutlej.

In the oldest texts of the Rigveda she is described as a "great and holy river in north-western India," but Michael Witzel notes that the Rigveda indicates that the Sarswati "had already lost its main source of water supply and must have ended in a terminal lake (samudra) approximately 3000 years ago." The middle books 3 and 7 and the late books 10 "depict the present-day situation, with the Sarasvatī having lost most of its water." The Sarasvati acquired an extalted status in the mythology of the Kuru Kingdom, where the Rigveda was compiled.

As a goddess 

Sarasvati is mentioned some fifty times in the hymns of the Rigveda.  It is mentioned in thirteen hymns of the late books (1 and 10) of the Rigveda.

The most important hymns related to Sarasvati goddess are RV 6.61, RV 7.95 and RV 7.96. As a river goddess, she is described as a mighty flood, and is clearly not an earthly river. According to Michael Witzel, superimposed on the Vedic Sarasvati river is the heavenly river Milky Way, which is seen as "a road to immortality and heavenly after-life." The description of the Sarasvati as the river of heavens, is interpreted to suggest its mythical nature.

In 10.30.12, her origin as a river goddess may explain her invocation as a protective deity in a hymn to the celestial waters. In 10.135.5, as Indra drinks Soma he is described as refreshed by Sarasvati. The invocations in 10.17 address Sarasvati as a goddess of the forefathers as well as of the present generation. In 1.13, 1.89, 10.85, 10.66 and 10.141, she is listed with other gods and goddesses, not with rivers. In 10.65, she is invoked together with "holy thoughts" and "munificence", consistent with her role as a goddess of both knowledge and fertility.

Though Sarasvati initially emerged as a river goddess in the Vedic scriptures, in later Hinduism of the Puranas, she was rarely associated with the river. Instead, she emerged as an independent goddess of knowledge, learning, wisdom, music and the arts. The evolution of the river goddess into the goddess of knowledge started with later Brahmanas, which identified her as Vāgdevī, the goddess of speech, perhaps due to the centrality of speech in the Vedic cult and the development of the cult on the banks of the river. It is also possible to postulate two originally independent goddesses that were fused into one in later Vedic times. Aurobindo has proposed, on the other hand, that "the symbolism of the Veda betrays itself to the greatest clearness in the figure of the goddess Sarasvati ... She is, plainly and clearly, the goddess of the World, the goddess of a divine inspiration ...".

Other Vedic texts 
In post-Rigvedic literature, the disappearance of the Sarasvati is mentioned.  Also the origin of the Sarasvati is identified as Plaksa Prasravana (Peepal tree or Ashwattha tree as known in India and Nepal).

In a supplementary chapter of the Vajasaneyi-Samhita of the Yajurveda (34.11), Sarasvati is mentioned in a context apparently meaning the Sindhu: "Five rivers flowing on their way speed onward to Sarasvati, but then become Sarasvati a fivefold river in the land." According to the medieval commentator Uvata, the five tributaries of the Sarasvati were the Punjab rivers Drishadvati, Satudri (Sutlej), Chandrabhaga (Chenab), Vipasa (Beas) and the Iravati (Ravi).

The first reference to the disappearance of the lower course of the Sarasvati is from the Brahmanas, texts that are composed in Vedic Sanskrit, but dating to a later date than the Veda Samhitas. The Jaiminiya Brahmana (2.297) speaks of the 'diving under (upamajjana) of the Sarasvati', and the Tandya Brahmana (or Pancavimsa Br.) calls this the 'disappearance' (vinasana). The same text (25.10.11-16) records that the Sarasvati is 'so to say meandering' (kubjimati) as it could not sustain heaven which it had propped up.

The Plaksa Prasravana (place of appearance/source of the river) may refer to a spring in the Sivalik hills. The distance between the source and the Vinasana (place of disappearance of the river) is said to be 44 Ashwin (between several hundred and 1,600 miles) (Tandya Br. 25.10.16; cf. Av. 6.131.3; Pancavimsa Br.).

In the Latyayana Srautasutra (10.15-19) the Sarasvati seems to be a perennial river up to the Vinasana, which is west of its confluence with the Drshadvati (Chautang). The Drshadvati is described as a seasonal stream (10.17), meaning it was not from Himalayas. Bhargava has identified Drashadwati river as present-day Sahibi river originating from Jaipur hills in Rajasthan. The Asvalayana Srautasutra and Sankhayana Srautasutra contain verses that are similar to the Latyayana Srautasutra.

Post-Vedic texts 
Wilke and Moebus note that the "historical river" Sarasvati was a "topographically tangible mythogeme", which was already reduced to a "small, sorry trickle in the desert", by the time of composition of the Hindu epics. These post-Vedic texts regularly talk about drying up of the river, and start associating the goddess Sarasvati with language, rather than the river.

Mahabharata
According to the Mahabharata  the Sarasvati River dried up to a desert (at a place named Vinasana or Adarsana) and joins the sea "impetuously". MB.3.81.115 locates the state of Kurupradesh or Kuru Kingdom to the south of the Sarasvati and north of the Drishadvati. The dried-up, seasonal Ghaggar River in Rajasthan and Haryana reflects the same geographical view described in the Mahabharata.

According to Hindu scriptures, a journey was made during the Mahabharata by Balrama along the banks of the Saraswati from Dwarka to Mathura. There were ancient kingdoms too (the era of the Mahajanapads) that lay in parts of north Rajasthan and that were named on the Sarasvati River.

Puranas
Several Puranas describe the Sarasvati River, and also record that the river separated into a number of lakes (saras).

In the Skanda Purana, the Sarasvati originates from the water pot of Brahma and flows from Plaksa on the Himalayas. It then turns west at Kedara and also flows underground.  Five distributaries of the Sarasvati are mentioned. The text regards Sarasvati as a form of Brahma's consort Brahmi. According to the Vamana Purana 32.1-4, the Sarasvati rose from the Plaksa tree (Pipal tree).

The Padma Purana proclaims:

Smritis
 In the Manu Smriti, the sage Manu, escaping from a flood, founded the Vedic culture between the Sarasvati and Drishadvati rivers. The Sarasvati River was thus the western boundary of Brahmavarta: "the land between the Sarasvati and Drishadvati is created by God; this land is Brahmavarta."
 Similarly, the Vasistha Dharma Sutra I.8-9 and 12-13 locates Aryavarta to the east of the disappearance of the Sarasvati in the desert, to the west of Kalakavana, to the north of the mountains of Pariyatra and Vindhya and to the south of the Himalaya. Patanjali's Mahābhāṣya defines Aryavarta like the Vasistha Dharma Sutra.
 The Baudhayana Dharmasutra gives similar definitions,  declaring that Aryavarta is the land that lies west of Kalakavana, east of Adarsana (where the Sarasvati disappears in the desert), south of the Himalayas and north of the Vindhyas.

Contemporary religious significance 

Diana Eck notes that the power and significance of the Sarasvati for present-day India is in the persistent symbolic presence at the confluence of rivers all over India. Although "materially missing", she is the third river, which emerges to join in the meeting of rivers, thereby making the waters thrice holy.

After the Vedic Sarasvati dried, new myths about the rivers arose. Sarasvati is described to flow in the underworld and rise to the surface at some places. For centuries, the Sarasvati river existed in a "subtle or mythic" form, since it corresponds with none of the major rivers of present-day South Asia. The confluence (sangam) or joining of the Ganges and Yamuna rivers at Triveni Sangam, Allahabad, is believed to also converge with the unseen Sarasvati river, which is believed to flow underground.  This is despite Allahabad being at a considerable distance from the possible historic routes of an actual Sarasvati river.

At the Kumbh Mela, a mass bathing festival is held at Triveni Sangam, literally "confluence of the three rivers", every 12 years. The belief of Sarasvati joining at the confluence of the Ganges and Yamuna originates from the Puranic scriptures and denotes the "powerful legacy" the Vedic river left after her disappearance. The belief is interpreted as "symbolic". The three rivers Sarasvati, Yamuna, Ganga are considered consorts of the Hindu Trinity (Trimurti) Brahma, Vishnu (as Krishna) and Shiva respectively.

In lesser known configuration, Sarasvati is said to form the Triveni confluence with rivers Hiranya and Kapila at Somnath. There are several other Trivenis in India where two physical rivers are joined by the "unseen" Sarasvati, which adds to the sanctity of the confluence.

Romila Thapar notes that "once the river had been mythologized through invoking the memory of the earlier river, its name - Sarasvati - could be applied to many rivers, which is what happened in various parts of the [Indian] subcontinent."

Several present-day rivers are also named Sarasvati, after the Vedic Sarasvati:
 Sarsuti is the present-day name of a river originating in a submontane region (Ambala district) and joining the Ghaggar near Shatrana in PEPSU. Near Sadulgarh (Hanumangarh) the Naiwala channel, a dried out channel of the Sutlej, joins the Ghaggar. Near Suratgarh the Ghaggar is then joined by the dried up Drishadvati river.
 Sarasvati is the name of a river originating in the Aravalli mountain range in Rajasthan, passing through Sidhpur and Patan before submerging in the Rann of Kutch.
 Saraswati River, a tributary of Alaknanda River, originates near Badrinath
 Saraswati River in Bengal, formerly a distributary of the Hooghly River, has dried up since the 17th century.

Identification theories 
Already since the 19th century, attempts have been made to identify the mythical Sarasvati of the Vedas with physical rivers. Many think that the Vedic Sarasvati river once flowed east of the Indus (Sindhu) river. Scientists, geologists as well as scholars have identified the Sarasvati with many present-day or now-defunct rivers.

Two theories are popular in the attempts to identify the Sarasvati. Several scholars have identified the river with the present-day Ghaggar-Hakra River or dried up part of it, which is located in Northwestern India and Pakistan. A second popular theory associates the river with the Helmand river or an ancient river in the present Helmand Valley in Afghanistan.

Others consider Sarasvati a mythical river, an allegory not a "thing".

The identification with the Ghaggar-Hakra system took on new significance in the early 21st century, suggesting an earlier dating of the Rigveda, and renaming the Indus Valley Civilisation as the "Sarasvati culture", the "Sarasvati Civilization", the "Indus-Sarasvati Civilization" or the "Sindhu-Sarasvati Civilization," suggesting that the Indus Valley and Vedic cultures can be equated.

Rigvedic course

The Rigveda contains several hymns which give an indication of the flow of the geography of the river, and an identification of the Sarasvati as described in the later books of the Rigveda with the Ghaggra-Hakra:
 RV 3.23.4 mentions the Sarasvati River together with the Drsadvati River and the Āpayā River.
 RV 6.52.6 describes the Sarasvati as swollen (pinvamānā) by the rivers (sindhubhih).
 RV 7.36.6, "sárasvatī saptáthī síndhumātā" can be translated as "Sarasvati the Seventh, Mother of Floods," but also as "whose mother is the Sindhu", which would indicate that the Sarasvati is here a tributary of the Indus.
 RV 7.95.1-2, describes the Sarasvati as flowing to the samudra, a word now usually translated as "ocean," but which could also mean "lake."
 RV 10.75.5, the late Rigvedic Nadistuti sukta, enumerates all important rivers from the Ganges in the east up to the Indus in the west in a clear geographical order. The sequence "Ganges, Yamuna, Sarasvati, Shutudri" places the Sarasvati between the Yamuna and the Sutlej, which is consistent with the Ghaggar identification.

Yet, the Rigveda also contains clues for an identification with the Helmand river in Afghanistan: 
 The Sarasvati River is perceived to be a great river with perennial water, which does not apply to the Hakra and Ghaggar. 
 The Rigveda seems to contain descriptions of several Sarasvatis. The earliest Sararvati is said to be similar to the Helmand in Afghanistan which is called the Harakhwati in the Āvestā.
 Verses in RV 6.61 indicate that the Sarasvati river originated in the hills or mountains (giri), where she "burst with her strong waves the ridges of the hills (giri)". It is a matter of interpretation whether this refers only to the Himalayan foothills, where the present-day Sarasvati (Sarsuti) river flows, or to higher mountains.

The Rigveda was composed during the latter part of the late Harappan period, and according to Shaffer, the reason for the predominance of the Sarasvati in the Rigveda is the late Harappan (1900-1300 BCE) population shift eastwards to Haryana.

Ghaggar-Hakra River 
The present Ghaggar-Hakra River is a seasonal river in India and Pakistan that flows only during the monsoon season, but satellite images in possession of the ISRO and ONGC have confirmed that the major course of a river ran through the present-day Ghaggar River. The supposed paleochannel of the Hakra is actually a paleochannel of the Sutlej, flowing into the Nara river bed, presently a delta channel c.q. paleochannel of the Indus River. At least 10,000 years ago, well before the rise of the Harappan civilization, the sutlej diverted its course, leaving the Ghaggar-Hakra as a monsoon-fed river. Early in the 2nd millennium BCE the monsoons diminished and the Ghaggar-Hakra fluvial system dried up, which affected the Harappan civilisation.

Paleochannels and ancient course

While there is general agreement that the river courses in the Indus Basin have frequently changed course, the exact sequence of these changes and their dating have been problematic.

Pre-Holocene diversion of the Sutlej and Yamuna
Older publications have suggested that the Sutlej and the Yamuna drained into the Hakra well into Mature Harappan times, providing ample volume to the supply provided by the monsoon-fed Ghaggar. The Sutlej and Yamuna then changed course between 2500 BCE and 1900 BCE, due to either tectonic events or "slightly altered gradients on the extremely flat plains," resulting in the drying-up of the Hakra in the Thar Desert. More recent publications have shown that the Sutlej and the Yamuna shifted course well before Harappan times, leaving the monsoon-fed Ghaggar-Hakra which dried-up during late Harappan times.

Clift et al. (2012), using dating of zircon sand grains, have shown that subsurface river channels near the Indus Valley civilisation sites in Cholistan immediately below the presumed Ghaggar-Hakra channel show sediment affinity not with the Ghagger-Hakra, but instead with the Beas River in the western sites and the Sutlej and the Yamuna in the eastern ones. This suggests that the Yamuna itself, or a channel of the Yamuna, along with a channel of the Sutlej may have flowed west some time between 47,000 BCE and 10,000 BCE. The drainage from the Yamuna may have been lost from the Ghaggar-Hakra well before the beginnings of Indus civilisation.

Ajit Singh et al. (2017) show that the paleochannel of the Ghaggar-Hakra is a former course of the Sutlej, which diverted to its present course between 15,000 and 8,000 years ago, well before the development of the Harappan Civilisation. Ajit Singh et al. conclude that the urban populations settled not along a perennial river, but a monsoon-fed seasonal river that was not subject to devastating floods.

Khonde et al. (2017) confirm that the Great Rann of Kutch received sediments from a different source than the Indus, but this source stopped supplying sediments after ca. 10,000 years ago. Likewise, Dave et al. (2019) state that "[o]ur results disprove the proposed link between ancient settlements and large rivers from the Himalayas and indicate that the major palaeo-fluvial system traversing through this region ceased long before the establishment of the Harappan civilisation."

According to Chaudhri et al. (2021) "the Saraswati River used to flow from the glaciated peaks of the Himalaya to the Arabian sea," and an "enormous amount of water was flowing through this channel network until BC 11,147."

IVC and diminishing of the monsoons

Many Indus Valley civilisation (Harrapan Civilisation) sites are found on the banks of and in the proximity of the Ghaggar-Hakra fluvial system, due to the "high monsoon rainfall" which fed the Ghaggar-Hakra in Mature Harappan Times.

Giosan et al., in their study Fluvial landscapes of the Harappan civilisation, make clear that the Ghaggar-Hakra fluvial system was not a large glacier-fed Himalayan river, but a monsoonal-fed river. They concluded that the Indus Valley Civilisation  prospered when the monsoons that fed the rivers diminished around 5,000 years ago. When the monsoons, which fed the rivers that supported the civilisation, further diminished and the rivers dried out as a result, the IVC declined some 4000 years ago. This in particular effected the Ghaggar-Hakra system, which became an intermittent river and was largely abandoned. Localized Late IVC-settlements are found eastwards, toward the more humid regions of the Indo-Gangetic Plain, where the decentralised late Harappan phase took place.

The same widespread aridification in the third millennium BCE also led to water shortages and ecological changes in the Eurasian steppes, leading to a change of vegetation, triggering "higher mobility and transition to nomadic cattle breeding," These migrations eventually resulted in the Indo-Aryan migrations into South Asia.

Identification with the Sarasvati
A number of archaeologists and geologists have identified the Sarasvati river with the present-day Ghaggar-Hakra River, or the dried up part of it, despite the fact that it had already dried-up and become a small seasonal river before Vedic times.

In the 19th and early 20th century a number of scholars, archaeologists and geologists have identified the Vedic Sarasvati River with the Ghaggar-Hakra River, such as Christian Lassen (1800-1876), Max Müller (1823-1900), Marc Aurel Stein (1862-1943), C.F. Oldham and Jane Macintosh. Danino notes that "the 1500 km-long bed of the Sarasvati" was "rediscovered" in the 19th century. According to Danino, "most Indologists" were convinced in the 19th century that "the bed of the Ghaggar-Hakra was the relic of the Sarasvati."

Recent archaeologists and geologists, such as Philip and Virdi (2006), K.S. Valdiya (2013) have identified the Sarasvati with Ghaggar. According to Gregory Possehl, "Linguistic, archaeological, and historical data show that the Sarasvati of the Vedas is the modern Ghaggar or Hakra."

According to R.U.S. Prasad, "we [...] find a considerable body of opinions [sic] among the scholars, archaeologists and geologists, who hold that the Sarasvati originated in the Shivalik hills [...] and descended through Adi Badri, situated in the foothills of the Shivaliks, to the plains [...] and finally debouched herself into the Arabian sea at the Rann of Kutch." According to Valdiya, "it is plausible to conclude that once upon a time the Ghagghar was known as "Sarsutī"," which is "a corruption of "Sarasvati"," because "at Sirsā on the bank of the Ghagghar stands a fortress called "Sarsutī". Now in derelict condition, this fortress of antiquity celebrates and honours the river Sarsutī."

Textual and historical objections
Ashoke Mukherjee (2001),  is critical of the attempts to identify the Rigvedic Sarasvati. Mukherjee notes that many historians and archaeologists, both Indian and foreign, concluded that the word "Sarasvati" (literally "being full of water") is not a noun, a specific "thing". However, Mukherjee believes that "Sarasvati" is initially used by the Rigvedic people as an adjective to the Indus as a large river and later evolved into a "noun". Mukherjee concludes that the Vedic poets had not seen the palaeo-Sarasvati, and that what they described in the Vedic verses refers to something else. He also suggests that in the post-Vedic and Puranic tradition the "disappearance" of Sarasvati, which to refers to "[going] under [the] ground in the sands", was created as a complementary myth to explain the visible non-existence of the river.

Romila Thapar terms the identification controversial and dismisses it, noticing that the descriptions of Sarasvati flowing through the high mountains does not tally with Ghaggar's course and suggests that Sarasvati is Haraxvati of Afghanistan. Wilke and Moebus suggest that the identification is problematic since the Ghaggar-Hakra river was already dried up at the time of the composition of the Vedas, let alone the migration of the Vedic people into northern India.

Rajesh Kocchar further notes that, even if the Sutlej and the Yamuna had drained into the Ghaggar during Rigvedic, it still would not fit the Rigvedic descriptions because "the snow-fed Satluj and Yamuna would strengthen lower Ghaggar. Upper Ghaggar would still be as puny as it is today."

Helmand river 

An alternative suggestion for the identity of the early Rigvedic Sarasvati River is the Helmand River and its tributary Arghandab in the Arachosia region in Afghanistan, separated from the watershed of the Indus by the Sanglakh Range. The Helmand historically besides Avestan Haetumant bore the name Haraxvaiti, which is the Avestan form cognate to Sanskrit Sarasvati. The Avesta extols the Helmand in similar terms to those used in the Rigveda with respect to the Sarasvati: "The bountiful, glorious Haetumant swelling its white waves rolling down its copious flood". However unlike the Rigvedic Sarasvati, Helmand river never attained the status of a deity despite the praises in the Avesta. The identification of the Sarasvati river with the Helmand river was first proposed by Thomas (1886), followed by Alfred Hillebrandt a couple of years thereafter. 

According to Konrad Klaus (1989), the geographic situation of the Sarasvati and the Helmand rivers are similar. Both flow into terminal lakes: The Helmand flows into a swamp on the Iranian plateau (the extended wetland and lake system of Hamun-i-Helmand). This matches the Rigvedic description of the Sarasvati flowing to the samudra, which according to him at that time meant 'confluence', 'lake', 'heavenly lake', 'ocean'; the current meaning of 'terrestrial ocean' was not even felt in the Pali Canon.

Rajesh Kocchar, after a detailed analysis of the Vedic texts and geological environments of the rivers, concludes that there are two Sarasvati rivers mentioned in the Rigveda. The early Rigvedic Sarasvati, which he calls Naditama Sarasvati, is described in suktas 2.41, 7.36, etc. of the family books of the Rigveda, and drains into a samudra. The description of the Naditama Sarasvati in the Rigveda matches the physical features of the Helmand River in Afghanistan, more precisely its tributary the Harut River, whose older name was Haraxvatī in Avestan. The later Rigvedic Sarasvati, which he calls Vinasana Sarasvati, is described in the Rigvedic Nadistuti sukta (10.75), which was composed centuries later, after an eastward migration of the bearers of the Rigvedic culture to the western Gangetic plain some 600 km to the east. The Sarasvati by this time had become a mythical "disappeared" river, and the name was transferred to the Ghaggar which disappeared in the desert. The later Rigvedic Sarasvati is only in the post-Rigvedic Brahmanas said to disappear in the sands. According to Kocchar the Ganga and Yamuna were small streams in the vicinity of the Harut River. When the Vedic people moved east into Punjab, they named the new rivers they encountered after the old rivers they knew from Helmand, and the Vinasana Sarasvati may correspond with the Ghaggar-Hakra river.

Romila Thapar (2004) declares the identification of the Ghaggar with the Sarasvati controversial. Furthermore, the early references to the Sarasvati could be the Haraxvati plain in Afghanistan. The identification with the Ghaggar is problematic, as the Sarasvati is said to cut its way through high mountains, which is not the landscape of the Ghaggar.

Contemporary politico-religious meaning

Drying-up and dating of the Vedas 
The Vedic description of the goddess Sarasvati as a mighty river, and the Vedic and Puranic statements about the drying-up and diving-under of the Sarasvati, have been used by some as a reference point for a revised dating of the Vedic culture. Some see these descriptions as a mighty river as evidence for an earlier dating of the Rigveda, identifying the Vedic culture with the Harappan culture, which flourished at the time that the Gaggar-Hakra had not dried up, and rejecting the Indo-Aryan migrations theory, which postulates a migration at 1500 BCE.

Michel Danino places the composition of the Vedas therefor in the third millennium BCE, a millennium earlier than the conventional dates. Danino notes that accepting the Rigveda accounts as a mighty river as factual descriptions, and dating the drying up late in the third millennium, are incompatible. According to Danino, this suggests that the Vedic people were present in northern India in the third millennium BCE, a conclusion which is controversial amongst professional archaeologists. Danino states that there is an absence of "any intrusive material culture in the Northwest during the second millennium BCE," a biological continuity in the skeletal remains, and a cultural continuity. Danino then states that if the "testimony of the Sarasvati is added to this, the simplest and most natural conclusion is that the Vedic culture was present in the region in the third millennium."

Danino acknowledges that this asks for "studying its tentacular ramifications into linguistics, archaeoastronomy, anthropology and genetics, besides a few other fields".

Identification with the Indus Valley Civilisation
The Indus Valley Civilisation is sometimes called the "Sarasvati culture", "Sarasvati Civilization", "Indus Ghaggar-Hakra civilisation," "Indus-Sarasvati Civilization," or "Sindhu-Sarasvati Civilization" by Hindutva revisionists, referring to the Sarasvati river mentioned in the Vedas, and equating the Vedic culture with the Indus Valley Civilisation. In this view, the Harappan civilisation flourished predominantly on the banks of the Ghaggar-Hakra, not the Indus. For example, Danino notes that his proposed dating of the Vedas to the third millennium BCE coincides with the mature phase of the Indus Valley civilisation, and that it is "tempting" to equate the Indus Valley and Vedic cultures.

Romila Thapar points out that an alleged equation of the Indus Valley civilization and the carriers of Vedic culture stays in stark contrast to not only linguistic, but also archeological evidence. She notes that the essential characteristics of Indus valley urbanism, such as planned cities, complex fortifications, elaborate drainage systems, the use of mud and fire bricks, monumental buildings, extensive craft activity, are completely absent in the Rigveda. Similarly the Rigveda lacks a conceptual familiarity with key aspects of organized urban life (e.g. non-kin labour, facets or items of an exchange system or complex weights and measures) and doesn't mention objects found in great numbers at Indus Valley civilization sites like terracotta figurines, sculptural representation of human bodies or seals.

Hetalben Sindhav notes that claims of a large number of Ghaggar-Hakra sites are politically motivated and exaggerated. While the Indus remained an active river, the Ghaggar-Hakra dried-up, leaving many sites undisturbed. Sidhav further notes that the Ghaggar-Hakra was a tributary of the Indus, so the proposed Sarasvati nomenclatura is redundant.  According to archaeologist Shereen Ratnagar, many Ghaggar-Hakra sites in India are actually those of local cultures; some sites display contact with Harappan civilization, but only a few are fully developed Harappan ones. Moreover, around 90% of the Indus script seals and inscribed objects discovered were found at sites in Pakistan along the Indus river, while other places accounting only for the remaining 10%.

Revival 
In 2015, Reuters reported that "members of the Rashtriya Swayamsevak Sangh believe that proof of the physical existence of the Vedic river would bolster their concept of a golden age of Hindu India, before invasions by Muslims and Christians." The Bharatiya Janata Party Government had therefore ordered archaeologists to search for the river.

According to the government of Indian state of Haryana, research and satellite imagery of the region has confirmed to have found the lost river when water was detected during digging of the dry river bed at Yamunanagar. Surveys and satellite photographs confirm that there was once a great river that rose in the Himalayas, entered the plains of Haryana, flowed through the Thar-Cholistan desert of Rajasthan and eastern Sindh (running roughly parallel to the Indus) and then reached the sea in the Rann of Kutchh in Gujarat. The strange marshy landscape of the Rann of Kutchh is partly due to the fact that it was once the estuary of a great river.

The government constituted Saraswati Heritage Development Board (SHDB) had conducted a trial run on 30 July 2016 filling the river bed with 100 cusecs of water which was pumped into a dug-up channel from tubewells at Uncha Chandna village in Yamunanagar. The water is expected to fill the channel until Kurukshetra, a distance of 40 kilometres. Once confirmed that there is no obstructions in the flow of the water, the government proposes to flow in another 100 cusecs after a fortnight. At that time, there were also plans to build three dams on the river route to keep it flowing perennially.

In 2021, the Chief Minister of the State of Haryana stated that over 70 organizations were involved with researching the Saraswati River's heritage, and that the river "is still flowing underground from Adi Badri and up to Kutch in Gujarat."

The Saraswati revival project seeks to build channels and dams along the route of the lost river, and develop it as a tourist and pilgrimage circuit.

See also 

 Brahmavarta
 Drishadwati River
 Rigvedic rivers
 Sapta Sindhu
 Saraswati (goddess)
 Indus River
 Saraswat Brahmins
 Triveni Sangam
 Sarasvati Pushkaram

Notes

References

Sources 
Printed sources

 

 
 

 
 

 
 
 
 

 
 

 

 
 
 
 

 Hock, Hans (1999) Through a Glass Darkly: Modern "Racial" Interpretations vs. Textual and General Prehistoric Evidence on Arya and Dasa/Dasyu in Vedic Indo-Aryan Society." in Aryan and Non-Aryan in South Asia, ed. Bronkhorst & Deshpande, Ann Arbor.

 

 Keith and Macdonell. 1912. Vedic Index of Names and Subjects.
 
 
 
 Kochhar, Rajesh, 'On the identity and chronology of the ic river ' in Archaeology and Language III; Artefacts, languages and texts, Routledge (1999), .
 

 
 

 
 
 
 
 

 Oldham, R.D. 1893. The Sarsawati and the Lost River of the Indian Desert. Journal of the Royal Asiatic Society. 1893. 49-76.

 
 
 
 
 

 Radhakrishna, B.P. and Merh, S.S. (editors): Vedic Saraswati: Evolutionary History of a Lost River of Northwestern India (1999) Geological Society of India (Memoir 42), Bangalore. Review (on page 3) Review

 
 
 
 
 
 

 S. G. Talageri, The RigVeda - A Historical Analysis chapter 4 

 
 
 

 
 
 
 
 

Web-sources

Further reading
 Chakrabarti, D. K., & Saini, S. (2009). The problem of the Sarasvati River and notes on the archaeological geography of Haryana and Indian Panjab. New Delhi: Aryan Books International.
 An archaeological tour along the Ghaggar-Hakra River by Aurel Stein

External links 

 Is River Ghaggar, Saraswati? by Tripathi, Bock, Rajamani, Eir
 Saraswati – the ancient river lost in the desert by A. V. Sankaran
 Sarasvati research and Education Trust
 C.P. Rajendran (2019), Saraswati: The River That Never Was, Flowing Always in the People's Hearts, The Wire
 Map 

 
Locations in Hindu mythology
Mythological rivers
Ancient Indian rivers
Rigvedic rivers
Sacred rivers
Sea and river goddesses
Rivers of Haryana
Indigenous Aryanism
Rivers in Buddhism
Rivers of India
Rigvedic deities